Tuen Mun Town Plaza (S as tmtplaza; Chinese: 屯門市廣場) is the largest shopping mall in the NW New Territories of Hong Kong. Established in 1988 and located in the town of Tuen Mun, it was developed by the Sino Group. It provides a large range of merchandise, offering residents a myriad of shopping, dining and entertainment facilities.

Creative promotional programmes are often held to attract customers. A complete renovation and refurbishment has finished to provide more than 1,000,000 sq. ft. and over five storeys. It is at the hub of transport links and networks which include bus services to various parts of Hong Kong, including express services to Hong Kong Island and Kowloon, Tuen Ma line to Kowloon and the Light Rail serving the western New Territories. More than 300,000 customers come to the mall each day.

Education
Tuen Mun Town Plaza is in Primary One Admission (POA) School Net 71. Within the school net are multiple aided schools (operated independently but funded with government money); no government schools are in the school net.

References

External links 

 Tuen Mun Town Plaza website 

Shopping centres in Hong Kong
Tuen Mun